Madras Talkies is an Indian entertainment company, which was established by director Mani Ratnam and his brother G. Srinivasan as partners in 1995. Madras Talkies has actively involved in production of films and television serials, which are distributed all over the world. The company has produced fifteen feature films and six television serials.

Prior to Madras Talkies, Ratnam previously served as a film producer on several projects with Aalayam Productions, alongside S. Sriram. Through his own directorial venture, Iruvar (1997), Madras Talkies made its debut as Ratnam's official production studio.

Films

Web series

Television serials

See also
Mani Ratnam
Cinema of Tamil Nadu

References

Film distributors of India
Entertainment companies established in 1995
Film production companies based in Chennai
1995 establishments in Tamil Nadu
Indian companies established in 1995
Television production companies of Tamil Nadu